John Brailsford  may refer to:

John Brailsford the elder (1692–1765), English poet
John Brailsford the younger (died 1775), English poet, son of the above